The Crown of Queen Adelaide was the consort crown of the British queen Adelaide of Saxe-Meiningen. It was used at Adelaide's coronation in 1831. It was emptied of its jewels soon afterwards, and has never been worn since.

Reasons for creation

Following the coronation of Mary of Modena in 1685, the crown made for Mary was used for the coronations of Mary II in 1689, Queen Anne in 1702 and Queen Caroline in 1727. However criticism of the continued use of this crown had mounted, for reasons of age, size, state of repair and because it was seen to be too theatrical and undignified. A specially made nuptial crown was used by Queen Charlotte, but in the preparations for the coronation of Adelaide of Saxe-Meiningen in 1831 Adelaide expressed a dislike for the crowns in the royal collection, it was ruled that the Modena crown was "unfit for Her Majesty's use". Plans were made for the creation of a new consort crown.

Design
The new crown followed British crown tradition in having four half arches, meeting a globe, on top of which sat a cross. The Queen had objected to the standard practice of hiring diamonds and jewels for a crown prior to its use.  Instead diamonds from her own private jewellery were installed in her new crown. Following the coronation, the diamonds were all removed, and the crown stored as a shell.

Subsequent history
Since Adelaide, all British queens consort have had their own special consort crown made for them, rather than wearing the crowns of any of their predecessors. Later consort crowns were made for Alexandra of Denmark (1902), Mary of Teck (1911) and Elizabeth Bowes-Lyon (1937).

Queen Adelaide's crown, emptied of its jewels and discarded by the royal family, was loaned to the Museum of London by the Amherst family from 1933 until 1985. It was purchased by Asprey in 1987 and later acquired by Jefri Bolkiah, Prince of Brunei, who presented it to the United Kingdom. It had been valued at £425,000 in 1995 for the purposes of an application to export the crown to the United States. The application was withdrawn during a review by the Reviewing Committee on the Export of Works of Art. It is part of the Royal Collection and has been on public display in the Martin Tower at the Tower of London since 1996.

Footnotes

  . 

1831 works
Crown Jewels of the United Kingdom
Adelaide
Adelaide of Saxe-Meiningen